The Feroz Award for Best Screenplay (Spanish: Premio Feroz al mejor guion) is one of the annual awards given at the Feroz Awards, presented by the Asociación de Informadores Cinematográficos de España. It was first presented in 2014 and includes both original and adapted screenplays.

Winners and nominees

2010s

2020s

See also
 Goya Award for Best Original Screenplay
 Goya Award for Best Adapted Screenplay

References

External links
 Official website

Feroz Awards
2014 establishments in Spain
Awards established in 2014
Screenwriting awards for film